Gyroporus subalbellus is a species of bolete fungus in the family Gyroporaceae. Found in North America, it was described by American mycologist William Alphonso Murrill in 1910. Edible.

See also
List of North American boletes

References

External links

Boletales
Fungi described in 1910
Fungi of North America
Taxa named by William Alphonso Murrill